Qaleh-ye Ali (also Romanized as Qal‘eh-ye ‘Ālī) is a village in Hamaijan Rural District, Hamaijan District, Sepidan County, Fars Province, Iran. At the 2006 census, its population was 123, in 35 families.

References 

Populated places in Sepidan County